Sabancı Center is a complex of skyscrapers which consists of two skyscrapers located close to the Büyükdere Avenue in Beşiktaş district of Istanbul, Turkey. The third one is approved. Current tallest skyscraper of that complex is Akbank Tower.

Special features of the project

 39-floor Akbank Headquarters tower 
 34-floor Sabancı Holding tower 
 Conference Center have capacity up to 638 people 
 Three multi-use and audio-visual meeting rooms (up to 150+70+70) separated by portable partitions 
 Sabancı Holding and Akbank Headquarter towers also have 7 meeting rooms. One of the meeting rooms has video conference system 
 Restaurants and cafeterias are capable of serving 2,500 people 
 VIP dining rooms 
 Breakfast and café service during day 
 Emergency ambulance service between 07:30 - 19:00 Monday - Saturday 
 Photocopy service 
 Branch bank 
 Dry cleaning service 
 Branch post office 
 Branch "Vista" travel agency office 
 440-vehicle open and 36 vehicle closed car park 
 A total of 24 elevators in the towers, including two fire and eight express elevators 
 A fire warning, prevention, and intervention system that is compliance with international standards 
 An energy distribution system which permits flexible office set - up and design 
 Electrically commanded and controlled air-conditioning, and elevators 
 Electronic security and prevention systems that meet international standards 
 Modern, computer-aided building management 
 Centralized clock system 
 Card-controlled entrance and exit system 
 Sound, music, and individual location public address system 
 Inter floor document delivery via pneumatic tubes 
 Satellite and radio broadcasting 
 Economic energy use

Technical features of the project

 Construction type: Concrete 
 Construction site area: 20,475 m2 
 Total construction area: 107,000 m2 
 Construction height -/+ 0.00 nominal spot height: 157.32 m 
 Excavation: 250,000 m2 
 Pile retaining wall: 8,350 m2 
 Molds (neo-mold system): 250,000 m2 
 Reinforcing rods: 10,000 tons 
 Concrete: 70,000 m3 
 Waterproofing: 27,000 m2 
 Foundations: 18,000 m3 
 Aluminum: 150 tons 
 Glass: 25,000 m2

See also 
 List of tallest buildings in Istanbul

External links
 Emporis Buildings Database - Sabancı Center

Office buildings completed in 1993
Sabancı family
Beşiktaş
Skyscrapers in Istanbul
Twin towers
Skyscraper office buildings in Turkey